Maliheh Kut-e Sad (also Romanized as Malīḩeh Kūt-e S‘ad) is a village in Hoveyzeh Rural District, in the Central District of Hoveyzeh County, Khuzestan Province, Iran. At the 2006 census, its population was 461, in 68 families.

References 

Populated places in Hoveyzeh County